Epimaco Ardina Velasco (December 12, 1935 – January 27, 2014), popularly known as Epi, was a Filipino politician who served as DILG Secretary, governor of Cavite, and NBI Director. He was the first NBI Director who rose from the ranks and rose to prominence at the NBI with the killing of Number 1 Most Wanted Man in Cavite, Leonardo Manecio aka Nardong Putik.

Early and career 
Epimaco A. Velasco was born on December 12, 1935 in Tanza, Cavite. He finished his college at the Lyceum of the Philippines with a Bachelor of Laws (1960).
A virtuous man dedicated to duty, Epimaco A. Velasco rose from the ranks to become one of the most admired directors of the National Bureau of Investigation. As an agent, he worked hard to solve many baffling cases, and as Bureau chief, he spearheaded the NBI in its quest to solve crimes and at the same time, to curb corruption among its ranks.

Capturing Nardong Putik 
As a fugitive, Putik and his men continued to instill terror in Cavite. Among the cases he was involved in were the illegal cultivation of marijuana and money extortion activities. On February 10, 1971, the National Bureau of Investigation's Narcotics division surveyed a marijuana plantation in Imus, Cavite allegedly being protected by Putik. Two NBI Agents, Rogelio Domingo and Antonio Dayao were captured, tortured, and killed by Nardong Putik and his men. The incident sealed Putik's fate: Angered by the heinous crime, NBI Director Jolly Bugarin ordered all his Agents to capture dead or alive Nardo and all responsible for the death of Agents Domingo and Dayao. NBI Agent Epimaco "Eppy" Velasco was then installed as the new Chief of the NBI Narcotics Division. In a month's time, they were able to record the movements of Nardong Putik. Later, with enough data, they were able to track his full whereabouts confidently to enable them to launch the operation to capture him on October 10, 1971. The operation which was a joint NBI-PC-Imus police force was composed of some 20 men. Troopers from the 233rd PC Company were led by Capt. Manuel Bruan. At 5:00 in the morning, the light of the house of the mistress of Nardo went out. After a few minutes, Nardo drives his Chevrolet Impala car out to the main Manila-Cavite highway. For unknown reasons, or maybe Nardong Putik senses that he is being tailed by the Philippine Constabulary, he was able to escape the PC dragnet or checkpoint at Panamitan and Talon, Kawit, Cavite. However, Nardong Putik did not notice a Volkswagen Kombi tailing him in the highway at the same time. The Kombi contained NBI Agents Velasco, Nasol, Utico, Bautista and others. They chased Nardo's car, and at Noveleta, Cavite, they were able to overtake the Impala and was at the right side of the car. Velasco shouted "NARDO!". He sensed the danger and immediately reached for his .45 pistol. At that moment, the NBI Agents opened fire with their revolvers, carbines, and submachine guns, peppering the car, and causing Nardo's instant death. The car lurched to the side of the highway and stopped. The Agents then immediately jumped out of their vehicle and took cover. Some Agents were still firing their guns to make sure that Nardo will not retaliate. The Impala was later hauled into NBI Headquarters in Manila, with the dead Putik inside, in full view of Director Bugarin. The news became a flash report on local television, and a top newspaper story the next day. That mission cemented the fame of Agent Velasco, who later became NBI Director in the nineties.

Political career 
In 1995, he ran for Governor. He picked Ramon "Bong" Revilla, Jr., son of Senator Ramon Revilla as his running mate under Lakas-Laban Coalition. He defeated the incumbent Governor Juanito Remulla, Sr. of the Nationalist Peoples Coalition. In the 2001 elections, he ran as Congressman of 2nd district of Cavite but was defeated by former ABS-CBN reporter Gilbert Remulla, son of the former Governor Remulla and in 2004, he ran again for Governor and once again was defeated by incumbent Governor Ayong Maliksi.

Government service
 Secretary, Department of Interior and Local Government (Feb 4, 1998 to Jun 28, 1998)
 Provincial Governor of Cavite (1995–1998)
 Director, National Bureau of Investigation (1992–1995)
 Assistant Director, National bureau of Investigation (1988–1992)
 Acting Director, National Bureau of Investigation (1992)

Personal life
Epimaco Velasco first served as a helper in the city court of Manila from 1955 to 1962 while studying. In his determination to succeed, he entered any opportunity for the betterment of his career until 1960 when he finally graduated and attained Bachelor of Laws. Two years after, he entered the NBI and became an NBI Agent I. In 1988, he became the Assistant director of the department, and in 1992, he finally became the director of the department.

Inspired by his story, his life story was made into a movie in 1994, entitled "Epimaco Velasco: NBI" portrayed by Fernando Poe Jr.

Death 
On January 27, 2014, he died due to heart failure at the age of 78.

Awards and recognitions received
 Presidential Commendation - In connection with the operation which resulted in the killing of Nardong Putik, Public Enemy No.1 of Cavite.
 1991 Gintong Ama Awardee for public service.
 1993 Most Outstanding Alumnus, College of Law, Lyceum of the Philippines.
 September 22, 1993, 1st Place-Hall of Fame/ Hoy Gising Award given by ABS-CBN Broadcasting Corporation during the 1st Anniversary of Hoy Gising!, a public service TV program.
 January 1994 - No. 6 among 24 outstanding Public Servants as cited by Senator Ernesto Maceda.
 January 6, 1994- Fighting Cock Special Award, Progressive Alliance of Citizens for Democracy (PACD)
 May 1994 Dean Marcos Herras Award, Most Outstanding National Official, International Rotary Club District 3780.
 1997 Gintong Ama Awardee for Public Services.

References

1935 births
2014 deaths
Governors of Cavite
People from Tanza, Cavite
Filipino police officers
20th-century Filipino lawyers
Secretaries of the Interior and Local Government of the Philippines
Lakas–CMD (1991) politicians
Ramos administration cabinet members
Lyceum of the Philippines University alumni
Directors of the National Bureau of Investigation of the Philippines
Recipients of the Presidential Medal of Merit (Philippines)